The Baby-Sitters Club is an American comedy-drama television series created by Rachel Shukert, based on the children's novel series of the same name by Ann M. Martin. It was released on Netflix on July 3, 2020. In October 2020, the series was renewed for a second season which was released on October 11, 2021. In March 2022, the series was canceled after two seasons. The series received universal acclaim, with praise going to its faithfulness to its source material and appeal for modern audiences.

Plot
The series follows the friendship and adventures of five middle-schoolers as they start a babysitting business in Stoneybrook, Connecticut.

Cast and characters

Main

 Sophie Grace as Kristy Thomas, the president of the club, she is a vocal individual, frequently sharing her opinion about feminism as well as other social troubles
 Momona Tamada as Claudia Kishi, the popular vice president of the club who has a passion for any type of art, but she frequently struggles in her studies. She hides candy around her room, which is the meeting place for the club. She is Japanese American, but never learned to speak Japanese.
 Shay Rudolph as Stacey McGill, the treasurer of the club who is from Upper West Side of Manhattan. She does very well in math. She is also diabetic.
 Malia Baker as Mary Anne Spier, the shy secretary of the club and Kristy's best friend. She is portrayed as biracial in the 2020 series. She is known in season 1 as the "baby" of the club. She lost her mother when she was 18 months old and has a very overprotective father.
 Alicia Silverstone as Elizabeth Thomas-Brewer, Kristy's divorced mother 
 Mark Feuerstein as Watson Brewer, Elizabeth's wealthy fiancé and later husband. Kristy dislikes him at first, but later in the show, she grows accustomed to him.
 Xochitl Gomez (season 1) and Kyndra Sanchez (season 2) as Dawn Schafer, Mary Anne's new friend who recently moved to Stoneybrook from Los Angeles and the alternate officer of the club. She is Hispanic-American and her mother used to go to school with Mary Anne's father, Richard Spier.
 Vivian Watson as Mallory Pike (recurring Season 1, starring season 2)
 Anais Lee as Jessi Ramsey (guest Season 1, starring season 2)

Recurring

 Takayo Fischer as Mimi Yamamoto, Claudia's grandmother. Claudia and Mimi have a special relationship.
 Aya Furukawa as Janine Kishi, the smart but distant older sister of Claudia who does have a soft side In season 2, she comes out as lesbian.
 Marc Evan Jackson as Richard Spier, Mary Anne's overprotective father who rekindles his high school relationship with Sharon Porter
 Benjamin Goas as David Michael Thomas, Kristy's youngest brother
 Dylan Kingwell as Sam Thomas, Kristy's older brother and Stacey's crush
 Sebastian Billingsley-Rodriguez as Andrew Brewer, Watson's son
 Sophia Reid-Gantzert as Karen Brewer, Watson's imaginative, 'strange' daughter
 Rian McCririck as Logan Bruno, Mary Anne's love interest
 Jessica Elaina Eason as Sharon Porter, Dawn's free-spirited mother who develops a relationship with Richard Spier
 Kelcey Mawema as Ashley Wyeth, Janine Kishi's girlfriend

Episodes

Series overview

Season 1 (2020)

Season 2 (2021)

Production

Development
In February 2019, Netflix ordered a 10-episode reboot based on The Baby-Sitters Club with Ann M. Martin as producer, Rachel Shukert as showrunner, and Michael De Luca and Lucia Aniello as executive producers. Aniello also directed. On October 28, 2020, Netflix renewed the series for a second season. Filming for the second season finished on April 28, 2021, after three months of shooting.

Casting
Alicia Silverstone and Mark Feuerstein joined the cast in August 2019. In March 2020, Sophie Grace, Malia Baker, Momona Tamada, Shay Rudolph and Xochitl Gomez joined the cast of the series. On March 18, 2021, it was reported that Kyndra Sanchez joined the cast as Dawn Schafer, replacing Gomez due to scheduling conflicts with Doctor Strange in the Multiverse of Madness.

Design 
Cynthia Ann Summers is the series' costume designer. She told Vulture, "We definitely wanted to make sure that, whenever we could, we'd give a nod to the style of the '90s and even some of the book covers." One notable piece is Claudia's yellow plaid pantsuit, a reference to Clueless.

Summers told Refinery29, "Most of the characters' [looks] were purchased from places these girls would shop in real life: Zara, H&M, American Eagle, Gap, Urban Outfitters, Aritzia, Topshop, Kate Spade, Alice + Olivia, Anthropologie, Nordstrom . . . Because we shot in Canada, 80 percent of everyone's fashion was purchased at Simons in Vancouver. Also lots and lots of vintage shopping and upcycling."

Release
The series was initially set to premiere in May 2020, but was delayed to July because of dubbing issues with international programming. The ten-episode first season of The Baby-Sitters Club premiered on July 3, 2020.  The eight-episode second season was released on October 11, 2021.

Cancellation 
On March 11, 2022, it was reported the series was cancelled by Netflix after two seasons. While the series had received critical acclaim and developed a fan following, it had purportedly "not been able to attract a wide audience; the eight-episode Season 2, released October 11, failed to crack Nielsen’s Top 10 weekly streaming rankings and only appeared in the Netflix Top 10 for one week at No. 9."

In an interview with Vulture, showrunner Rachel Shukert said producers had surmised Netflix was not moving forward with a third season since the beginning of February 2022. According to Shukert, viewership for the first season met and even exceeded Netflix's expectations, but the streaming service grew to prioritize shows that viewers binged (completing new seasons quickly) upon release.

Shukert added, "A lot of times, Netflix things come out and for whatever reason, if the algorithm doesn’t put it in front of you, no one knows it’s on. I heard from so many people who loved season one that they didn’t even know season two had come out. How is that possible? How does the algorithm not know that you watched and loved the entire first season and then immediately show season two to you? Why is this not getting in front of people that want to watch it?"

Vulture writer Kathryn VanArendonk opined, "For fans, the end of The Baby-Sitters Club is disappointing because so few series fill its specific niche: stories about preteen girls that don’t oversexualize or infantilize them," which Shukert agreed with by saying, “It seems like girls are expected to go straight from Doc McStuffins to Euphoria."

Reception

Critical response

The series received critical acclaim. For the first season, review aggregator Rotten Tomatoes reported an approval rating of 100% based on 55 reviews, with an average rating of 8.57/10. The website's critical consensus reads, "Sweet, sincere, and full of hope, The Baby-Sitters Club grounded approach honors its source material while updating the story for a new generation." On Metacritic, it has a weighted average score of 87 out of 100 based on 18 reviews, indicating "universal acclaim".

Critics praised the show for managing to be both current and also true to the book series' spirit. Meghan O'Keefe of Decider praised the fourth episode of the first season for its portrayal of a transgender child and wrote the series is "unabashedly feminist" and "does more than just affirm that transgender children exist and matter and are worthy of respect; the show argues for these children's rights."

Writing for The Guardian, Lucy Mangan said, "What could have been a sugary nostalgia-fest or worse a reboot that indulged the apparently insatiable urge to sex up material from a more innocent time, regardless of the age and/or continued innocence of its audience, is in fact a funny, fresh reimagining. Building on Martin's solid, good-hearted tales, it maintains a contemporary feel without losing the old-fashioned charm at its heart." Writing for the Hollywood Reporter, Robyn Bahr called the show "not only warm and effervescent, [but] downright among the best shows the streaming platform has produced to date."

Rebecca Onion of Slate said, "The new show is indeed adorable—the multiracial group of suburban middle schoolers earnestly booking gigs from their perch in Claudia Kishi's colorful bedroom is just as plucky and kind as ever . . . The new show has gotten plaudits for its diverse cast and plotlines, but in many important ways, the whole idea is a pure fantasy: of suburban community, of gentle coming-of-age, of meaningful work that teaches responsibility and pays just enough for fancy new paintbrushes."

Widespread acclaim was given to the series' young cast. Petrana Radulovic of Polygon said, "Like their book counterparts, all the girls in The Baby-Sitters Club are more in-depth than their one-word trope descriptor (tomboy, goody two-shoes, artsy kid, prep, hippie) implies, thanks in part to the skillful performances from the young actresses. As spunky, outspoken Kristy, Sophie Grace adds nuance to her bossy, bratty attitude, grounding what could be an over-the-top performance with some tender moments. Momona Tamada, of To All the Boys I've Loved Before fame, captures Claudia's quirkiness and energy, but not without pangs of isolation because she feels her family will never understand her."

Kelly Lawler, writing for USA Today, said the show was "optimistic but not deluded, youthful but not juvenile and sweet but not mawkish. Its quintet of young actresses (the original four sitters and one mid-season addition) are talented beyond their years, but the dialogue never makes them sound like 40-year-old Hollywood scriptwriters." Hank Stuever, writing for The Washington Post, noted "the show's remarkably talented cast of young actresses, all of whom either never learned the kidz-show style of overacting ('schmacting,' we sometimes call it), or were never afflicted with it to begin with. They are wholly believable in the roles of these idealized youths, with especially good performances from Tamada and Baker."

Jenny Singer, writing for Glamour, called the show "both unbelievably wholesome and seriously entertaining. The girls buy a landline phone on Etsy, hit up local parents with targeted Instagram ads, and make comments like, 'Art shouldn't be only the province of the privileged!' Their comedy is funny, their trauma is real, their style choices (by costume designer Cynthia Ann Summers) slay."

The second season has a 100% approval rating on Rotten Tomatoes, based on 12 reviews, with an average rating of 8.6/10. The website's critics consensus states, "The Baby-Sitters Club returns with a strong second season that explores new issues with care and gives its charming cast plenty of room to shine."

Accolades

Notes

References

External links
 
 
 

2020 American television series debuts
2021 American television series endings
2020s American comedy-drama television series
2020s American school television series
2020 series
American television shows based on children's books
Coming-of-age television shows
English-language Netflix original programming
Television series about teenagers
Television series reboots
Television shows based on American novels
Television shows set in Connecticut
Children's and Family Emmy Award winners